Fiona Lloyd-Davies is a photojournalist and documentary maker whose work is focused on human rights abuses in conflict zones. She is a graduate of the Royal College of Art and has won various awards for her work.

In 2000 Lloyd-Davies produced a documentary Licence to Kill, for which the Royal Television Society (RTS) awarded her the Best International Journalism of the Year. In 2005 her documentary The Baghdad Blogger: Salam Pax won another RTS award. In 2010 Lloyd-Davies traveled to the Democratic Republic of Congo to film a documentary for BBC3 titled, The World`s Most Dangerous Place for Women and to work on an independent project titled, Field of Hope.

She is a former producer for the BBC show, Newsnight.

References

Bibliography

 

British documentary film producers
British photojournalists
Living people
Alumni of the Royal College of Art
Year of birth missing (living people)